Aysel Baykal l (1939 – January 24, 2003) was a Turkish female jurist, politician and former government minister.

Aysel Baykal graduated from Istanbul University's Faculty of Law. She
served as a city councillor in the local government legislative bodies of Istanbul Province and Istanbul Municipality. On October 14, 1979, she became a member of the Senate of the Republic representing Istanbul from the Republican People's Party (CHP), which ended on September 12, 1980, when the Senate was dissolved by the 1980 military coup. She entered the 18th parliament, and served until 1991.

Following the merger of the 1983-established Social Democratic Populist Party (SHP) with the CHP in 1995, Baykal was appointed from outside the parliament Minister of State responsible for "Women, Family and Social Policies" on March 27, 1995, succeeding Önay Alpago. She served at this post in the 50th government led by female Prime Minister of Turkey Tansu Çiller until October 5, 1995.

In September 1995, she led a group of 14 Turkish women organizations to the World Conference on Women held in Beijing, China. She ran for the 1999 general election without success.

Aysel Baykal died in Istanbul at the age of 64 on January 24, 2003. She was buried at the Old Topkapı Cemetery following the religious funeral service at Şişli Mosque.

References

1939 births
Politicians from Ankara
Istanbul University Faculty of Law alumni
Turkish jurists
Women local politicians
Turkish city councillors
Republican People's Party (Turkey) politicians
Members of the Senate of the Republic (Turkey)
Members of the 18th Parliament of Turkey
Deputies of Istanbul
Women government ministers of Turkey
Government ministers of Turkey
Members of the 50th government of Turkey
Ministers of State of Turkey
2003 deaths
20th-century Turkish women politicians